Philip Kent may refer to:

 Phil Kent (born 1951), American media and public relations consultant
 Philip I. Kent, American media executive

See also
 Philip Kent Grey, 7th Earl Grey (born 1940), British pilot and hereditary peer